Pakes is a surname. Notable people with the surname include:

Andrew Pakes (born 1973), British politician
Ariél Pakes (born 1949), American-Canadian economist